Babbar Patera is a patera, or a complex crater with scalloped edges, on Jupiter's moon Io. It is named after a Sumerian sun god, and its name was approved by the International Astronomical Union in 1979. Some scarps near Babbar Patera may represent faults. Immediately south of Babbar Patera is the plateau Lyrcea Planum, and further south is Svarog Patera. To the east is the mountain Egypt Mons.

References

Surface features of Io (moon)